Tolcay Ciğerci (born 24 January 1995) is a German-born Turkish professional footballer who plays as a midfielder for VSG Altglienicke.

Career
Ciğerci made his professional debut on 24 September 2014, replacing Zoltán Stieber for the final 17 minutes of Hamburg's 1–0 Bundesliga defeat at Borussia Mönchengladbach.

In January 2017, Ciğerci joined SpVgg Greuther Fürth, initially playing for the club's reserves. He then joined Berliner AK 07 in the summer 2018, but left at the end of the season where his contract expired. However, he resigned with the club on 6 September 2019, signing a contract for the rest of the season.

On 11 January 2022, Ciğerci signed a 2.5-year contract with Samsunspor.

Personal life
He is the younger brother of İstanbul Başakşehir midfielder Tolga Ciğerci, who has played at youth level for Germany.

References

External links
 
 
 

1995 births
Living people
People from Nordenham
German people of Turkish descent
Turkish footballers
German footballers
Footballers from Lower Saxony
Association football midfielders
Turkey youth international footballers
Bundesliga players
2. Bundesliga players
3. Liga players
Regionalliga players
TFF First League players
Hamburger SV players
SpVgg Greuther Fürth players
Berliner AK 07 players
VSG Altglienicke players
FC Viktoria 1889 Berlin players
Samsunspor footballers